Prunus nigra, the Canada plum, Canadian plum, or black plum, is a species of Prunus native to eastern North America.

Description
The bark is gray-brown, older layers coming off in thick plates. The branchlets are bright green at first, later become dark brown tinged with red, and spiny.

The leaf petioles are stout, bearing two large dark glands and early deciduous, lanceolate, and three to five-lobed stipules.

The flowers are  diameter, with five rounded petals, white fading to pale pink, with a more or less irregularly notched margin; they are slightly fragrant, borne in three to four-flowered umbels, with short, thick peduncles, and appear before the leaves in mid to late spring. The flower stalks are slender and dark red. The calyx is conic, dark red, five-lobed, the lobes acute, finally reflexed, glandular, smooth on the inner surface, imbricate in bud, ovate, with short claws, imbricate in bud. There are 15–20 stamens, inserted on the calyx tube; filaments thread-like; anthers purplish, introrse, two-celled; cells opening longitudinally; the pistil has a superior ovary in the bottom of calyx tube, one-celled, with two ovules.

It matures in late summer or early autumn. The cotyledons are thick and fleshy. The species grows best in alluvial soils.

It can easily be confused with the related Prunus americana, differing most obviously in the leaf margins having blunt, gland-tipped teeth, rather than the sharp, glandless teeth of P. americana leaves.

Distribution and habitat
It can be found from Nova Scotia west to Minnesota and southeastern Manitoba, and south as far as Connecticut, Illinois, and Iowa. It formerly also grew in Ohio but is now thought to be extinct in that state. Isolated populations are present along streambanks in Saskatchewan and Alberta, along Lake Timiskaming in Northern Ontario, and along the Maine-New Brunswick border.

Ecology
The population along the Maine-New Brunswick border is severely threatened as the tree is a host for an aphid that menaces the local potato crop, with many of the trees having been cut down to reduce this problem.

A fungus in the genus Taphrina often attacks the plums; the young ovaries swell, often much larger than full grown plums, become hollow and often persist on the tree in winter. Known as "plum pockets", they appear pale green, leathery to the touch, and hollow with the exception of a few fibrous bands. The disease reduces regeneration of the plums.

Uses
The fruit is somewhat sour, clingstone, and very juicy. It can be eaten raw when fully ripe or cooked and made into pies preserves and jellies. Dried, these plums were a popular winter staple of indigenous peoples. French explorer Jacques Cartier remarked in his journal that he was presented with dried Canada plums by the St. Lawrence Iroquoians in his first expedition to Canada. Early settlers in the western U.S. and Canada also made use of these wild plums for dried fruit, as popularized by the autobiographical novel On the Banks of Plum Creek, the fourth book in Laura Ingalls Wilder's Little House on the Prairie series.

One of the few tree fruits indigenous to the Upper Midwest of the U.S., Northern Ontario and the prairie provinces of Canada and capable of surviving the harsh winters there, efforts were made to breed improved cultivars of these plums in the 19th century. Notable varieties still grown today include "Assiniboine" and "Cheney". P. nigra has the same number of chromosomes as P. salicina, the cultivated Japanese plum, and so the two cross-pollinate readily. Breeding work in the 20th century resulted in improved P. nigra x salicina hybrid varieties that retain the high quality of Japanese plums and the hardiness of wild Canada plums, such as "Pembina", "Superior", and "Patterson Pride".

The wood is bright red brown; heavy, hard, strong, and close-grained, with a density of 0.6918. When wounded the wood turns an attractive red colour, and sawlogs of intentionally wounded trees are sought after by woodturners.

References

External links
 

nigra
Trees of Canada
Trees of the United States
Trees of humid continental climate
nigra
Plants described in 1789
Fruits originating in North America
Trees of the Northeastern United States